The ATM-74 is a North Korean wooden box mine, it is a copy of the Soviet TMD-B. It is a wooden box packed with blocks of TNT, the top of the mine has three planks of wood underneath the central plank is a pressure fuze similar to Soviet MV-5 pressure fuze.

Specifications
 Length: 320 mm
 Width: 290 mm
 Height: 160 mm
 Weight: 9 kg
 Explosive content: 6 kg of TNT
 Operating pressure: 200 to 500 kg

References
 Jane's Mines and Mine Clearance 2005-2006
 

Anti-tank mines
Land mines of North Korea